Berlin Township is the name of the following places in the U.S. state of Michigan:

 Berlin Township, Ionia County, Michigan
 Berlin Township, St. Clair County, Michigan
 Berlin Charter Township, Michigan, Monroe County

See also 
 Berlin Township (disambiguation)
 Berlin, Michigan (disambiguation)

Michigan township disambiguation pages